Uri Malmilian (born April 24, 1957) is an Israeli former football player and current manager.

Early life and playing career
Born in the neighbourhood of Mamilla in West Jerusalem, Malmilian had a memorable playing career in the Liga Leumit at Beitar Jerusalem. He is regarded as one of the best Israeli players ever.

Malmilian joined the youth system of Beitar at an early age. At the age of sixteen(16), Malmilian had his first appearance in the senior team of Beitar. In this first match he scored a stunning goal from a corner kick.

Malmilian had his big breakthrough in the 1976 season. He led the squad to the second place of the league and won Beitar's first important trophy, the Israeli Cup, after his goal in the 90th minute in the Final sealed the title. He was chosen as Player of the Season and was convoked to the National Team even before at the age of 18. This made Uri the youngest player ever to be convoked to Israel national football team.

In 1979 Malmilian received a lucrative offer from French club Paris Saint-Germain but he decided to keep playing with Beitar.

In the next few years he formed a devastating trio with team-mates Danny Neuman and Victor Levy.

In 1986 Malmilian was the Top Scorer of the Israeli league with 14 goals in 30 matches.

In 1987, he coupled with Eli Ohana to bring the club its first championship.

In 1989, he won another Israeli Cup and then surprisingly announced a move to rival club Maccabi Tel Aviv. With Maccabi, Malmilian won another championship in 1992.

In 1993 Malmilian retired from active play.

Managerial career
His managerial career started with Hapoel Jerusalem where he managed to promote them to the Israeli Premier League.

He had success as the manager of Maccabi Netanya which he also promoted to the Israeli Premier League but he quit after disputes with the club's management.

Later he managed Hakoah Ramat Gan which is yet another club that he managed to promote to the Israeli Premier League.

On 2007/8 season Uri was managing Hapoel Petah Tikva In Liga Leumit. Malmilian won the Toto Cup for that league, but was fired later.

He managed Hapoel Ashkelon in the 2009–10 season of Liga Leumit and won again promotion to the Israeli Premier League.

In 2010 Uri was signed to Beitar Jerusalem for the 2010/2011 season, he been manager until he resigned on January 17, 2011.

Icon
Uri is regarded as one of the great symbols of Jerusalem fans. He became so famous that to this day vendors in the Mahane Yehuda Market have a saying "Every apple a Malmilian", meaning that every apple is of Top Notch quality.

Honors and awards

As a player
Club
Beitar Jerusalem
Israel State Cup (5) : 1976, 1979, 1985, 1986, 1989
Israeli championships: (1): 1986–87
Israel Super Cup  (2): 1976, 1986

Maccabi Tel Aviv
Israeli championships: (1): 1991–92

Individual
2 times Top Scorer of the League
2 times Israeli player of the year

As a manager
Israeli Second Division:
Winner (1): 1998–99
Runner-up (3): 1995–96, 2005–06, 2009–10
Toto Cup (Leumit):
Winner (1): 2007

References

External links
info on Beitar site
info on Maccabi Netanya site

1957 births
Living people
Israeli Jews
Israeli footballers
Footballers from Jerusalem
Beitar Jerusalem F.C. players
Maccabi Tel Aviv F.C. players
Hapoel Be'er Sheva F.C. players
Israel international footballers
Israeli football managers
Maccabi Netanya F.C. managers
Hapoel Petah Tikva F.C. managers
Hapoel Ashkelon F.C. managers
Beitar Jerusalem F.C. managers
Hakoah Amidar Ramat Gan F.C. managers
Israeli Premier League managers
Liga Leumit players
Association football midfielders
Israeli people of Kurdish-Jewish descent
Israeli Footballer of the Year recipients